Messy Goes to OKIDO is a 2015 animated comedy adventure television series for children, adapted from characters in OKIDO, a children's arts and science magazine. Inquisitive monster Messy, voiced by Adam Buxton, has adventures with his best friends Zoe and Felix in the colourful world of OKIDO. The first series aired in 2015 premiering on the BBC channel CBeebies, in 2022, the series got greenlit for a third season, set to premiere on CBeebies and HBO Max with Serious Kids acquiring worldwide distribution rights to all three seasons.

Overview 

The concept was picked up by London-based CG studio Squint/Opera. Working with Squint/Opera the concept was developed and re-imagined as a 52 part children's show combining live action footage with 3D renderings of Messy, his friends and the world of OKIDO.

The show aims to tackle a scientific topic in each episode, beginning with a question posed by Messy, for example: why do some things float and some things sink? He travels to OKIDO to discover the answers with the help of his friends Zoe & Felix and science trio Zim, Zam & Zoom who all have specific abilities which help them in their adventures.

Characters

Messy 
(Adam Buxton) Messy is a blue monster, excitable and curious. He lives underneath a bed and ventures out often to discover new things and learn. Whilst Messy means well his excitement can often land him in trouble, he can't control his urge to push buttons and can never get enough of eating socks (green socks are his preferred snack) and sandwiches. Whenever Messy finds something new that he's curious about, he travels to OKIDO to meet his friends and discover the answer.

Zoe 
(Kate Harbour) Zoe is one of Messy's best friends who lives in OKIDO with her brother Felix. Zoe is very smart and sensible, she hates being late and getting lost but has a passion for gadgets and gizmos, her favourite is her communications watch which she can use to call Zim, Zam & Zoom.

Felix 
(Shelley Longworth) Felix is one of Messy's best friends who lives in OKIDO with his sister Zoe. Felix loves using his imagination, being inventive and being prepared. He always packs a rucksack with useful things to help on their adventures.

Zim 
(Rob Rackstraw) Zim is a yellow talking computer with a white screen who knows a lots about science. He works in the ZZZ Tower with Zam and Zoom. Zim is not very good at practical things like reading maps and this often leads to disagreements with Zam. Whenever Zim gets confused his screen starts buffering.

Zam 
Zam is a triangle-shaped engineer who is brilliant at fixing things; she also works in the ZZZ Tower. She is quite bossy and sometimes tells Zim off if he is getting in the way. Zam uses her tools to make all kinds of gadgets and vehicles. Zam also loves doing experiments, particularly when they blow up.

Zoom 
Zoom is Zim and Zam's lab assistant. Zoom can morph into any shape he wants as long as it is not bigger than his body. This is very useful when the OKIDO gang are on an adventure. He doesn't speak but can make noises.

Other characters 
Mayor Oki – He is the Mayor of OKIDO, has his own TV show called OKIDO Today and a private jet 'Mayor-Force-One'.

Lolly – Lolly runs the ice-cream van and beach cafe. She is very friendly and chilled out.

Geoffrey – He owns the OKIDO cafe. He used to be an actor but one day forgot his lines and has never acted again...

Snowden – A friendly, fun-loving monster that lives in the snowy mountains.

Fluff – Fluff a big white cloud from the mountains, she is very calm, sweet and kind.

Stan Tall – Also known as Stan, he is OKIDO's biggest, strongest robot.

Series overview 
<onlyinclude>

Episodes

Series 1 (2015-2016)

Series 2 (2018-2019)

Series 3 (2022-2023)

References

External links
 Messy Goes to OKIDO CBeebies Page
 OKIDO Website
 OKIDO Official YouTube
 
 HBO Max Still Purging Content

CBeebies
Television series by DHX Media
2010s British children's television series
2015 British television series debuts
2010s British animated television series
British children's animated comedy television series
British computer-animated television series
British preschool education television series
Animated television series about monsters
2023 British television series endings
Animated preschool education television series
2010s preschool education television series
English-language television shows